Smart Omega Esports, formerly known as PLDT–Smart Omega, is a Philippine franchise-based professional esports team which competes in The Nationals, the top esports league in the Philippines sanctioned by the eSports National Association of the Philippines, and MPL Philippines. It was formed as a result of a partnership between esports team Sterling Global Dragons and corporate firms, PLDT Inc. and its mobile arm, Smart Communications.

History
Omega was officially launched by PLDT Inc. and its mobile arm, Smart Communications in February 2019. It is a collaboration of the private firms with Sterling Global Dragons which competed in the Road to The Nationals, a tournament held by the Nationals league organizers in 2018 in order to provide a means for the pioneer teams of the league to scout players for their rosters.

The Sterling Global Dragons was the winner of the final Dota 2 tournament of the Road to The Nationals. They secured a 3–1 victory over Station 751 in the championship match of the final tournament which adopted a best-of-five series format. The Dragons qualified for the final tournament of the Road to The Nationals twice. Initially they qualified through the tournament held in Manila. However, due to a roster change they had to forfeit their qualification spot to So Lucky team and qualified again for the final competition through the Cavite qualifiers.

In 2020, the name of the team was changed to just "Smart Omega Esports".

In November 2020, Filipino pro player Carlo "Kuku" Palad signed as the teams new Dota 2 head coach.

Rosters
The following consists of the rosters of Omega for the 2019 The Nationals season.

Dota 2
pos 1 : Ancelmo Miracle San Jose

Coach: Kuku Carlo Palad(JL`)

Mobile Legends

Current roster 

Also, it has a female roster called Smart Omega Empresses
 Amore (Rica Amores)
 Fibii (Phoebe Taburnal)
 Meraaay (Mery Vivero)
 Keishi (Kaye Alpuerto)
 Shinoaaa (Sheen Perez)
Coach: Jeoffryl Hans Bilonoac

Reference:

Tekken 7
Juliano Lozano (Jules)

Coach: Dannel Lozano (Pica)

Call Of Duty: Mobile

Current roster

Controversies 
Smart Omega's member of their new roster for Mobile Legends: Bang Bang Professional League Philippines (MPL PH) Season 8 Duane “Kelra” Pillas made homophobic remarks towards his co-professional player Johnmar “OhMyV33nus” Villaluna in a now deleted livestream. Kelra was suspended for 2 weeks due to his violations on MPL PH Season 8 rules specifically 12.3.3 Sexual Harassment and 12.3.4 Discrimination and Denigration as announced on MPL PH's official Facebook page on August 16, 2021. Kelra was also alleged to have sexually harassed another pro-player Chareeny “Ramella” Ramella of Thai MLBB professional team IDNS. Ramella mentioned that they haven't received an apology in a report as of August 17, 2021.

Smart Omega is officially banned in any Valve sponsored events after the match fixing happens last November, this includes current players Prince Daculan and Ryniel Keit "Zenki" Calvez, as well as previous players Patt Piolo "Piolz" Dela Cruz, Dave "Hiro" Miyata, and now-Execration player Van Jerico Manalaysay. Chris Ian "CTY" Francis Maldo, an Omega coach, is also on the list.

References

2019 establishments in the Philippines
Esports teams based in the Philippines
Dota teams
PLDT
Smart Communications
Mobile Legends: Bang Bang teams
League of Legends: Wild Rift teams